The 1987 V ACB International Tournament "IV Memorial Héctor Quiroga" was the 5th semi-official edition of the European Basketball Club Super Cup. It took place at Pabellón Municipal de Puerto Real, Puerto Real, Spain, on 29, 30 and 31 August 1987 with the participations of Tracer Milano (champions of the 1986–87 FIBA European Champions Cup), Cibona (champions of the 1986–87 FIBA European Cup Winner's Cup), FC Barcelona (champions of the 1986–87 FIBA Korać Cup) and Ram Joventut (runners-up of the 1986–87 Liga ACB).

League stage
Day 1, August 29, 1987

|}

Day 2, August 30, 1987

|}

Day 3, August 31, 1987

|}

Final standings 

European Basketball Club Super Cup
1987–88 in European basketball
1987–88 in Spanish basketball
1987–88 in Italian basketball
1987–88 in Yugoslav basketball
International basketball competitions hosted by Spain